Mian Rudan (also Romanized as Mīān Rūdān and Meyānrūdān; also known as Mīāndūrān) is a village in Silakhor-e Sharqi Rural District, in the Central District of Azna County, Lorestan Province, Iran. At the 2006 census, its population was 168, in 35 families.

References 

Towns and villages in Azna County